An adage (Latin: adagium) is a memorable and usually philosophical aphorism that communicates an important truth derived from experience, custom, or both, and that many people consider true and credible because of its longeval tradition, i.e. being handed down generation to generation, or memetic replication.

Variations and nature 

Some adages are products of folk wisdom that attempt to summarize a basic truth; these are generally known as "proverbs" or "bywords". An adage that describes a general moral rule is a "maxim". A pithy expression that has not necessarily gained credibility by tradition, but is distinguished by especial depth or excellent style is denominated an "aphorism", while one distinguished by wit or irony is often denominated an "epigram".

Through overuse, an adage may become denominated a "cliché", "truism", or "old saw". Adages originating in modernity are often given proper names and denominated  "laws", in imitation of the nomenclature of physical laws, or "principles". Some adages, such as Murphy's Law, are first formulated informally and given proper names later, while others, such as the Peter Principle, are given proper names when formulated; it might be argued that the latter do not represent true adages, but the two are often difficult to distinguish.

Adages that were collected and used by ancient writers inspired Dutch  humanist Desiderius Erasmus Roterodamus to publish his own collection. He revised his moderate volume of 800 adages many times until the final edition of Adagia published in 1536 included over 4,000. There have been many such collections since, usually in vernacular languages.

Historical usages and examples

Contemporary applications 
Adages formulated in popular works of fiction often find their way into popular culture, especially when a subculture devoted to the work or its genre exists, as in the case of novels of science fiction. Many professions and subcultures create their own adages, which are cognizable as a kind of jargon; such adages may find their way into popular use, sometimes being altered in the process. Online communities, such as those that develop in Internet forums or Usenet newsgroups, often generate their own adages.

See also
 List of adages named after people
 Aphorism
 Apophthegmata – several collections of aphorisms (adages)
 Brocard
 Epigram
 Epitaph
 Legal maxim
 Maxim
 Nursery rhyme
 Phraseme
 Principle
 Proverb
 Rhetoric
 Rule of thumb
 Saying

References

External links

 
Paremiology